Fazakerley is a Liverpool City Council Ward in the Liverpool Walton Parliamentary constituency. The ward boundary was changed in 2004 when the number of councillors was reduced.

By-elections were held in 2010 following the death of Councillor Jack Spriggs, and 2015 following the resignation of Councillor Louise Ashton-Armstrong.

Councillors

 indicates seat up for re-election after boundary changes.

 indicates seat up for re-election.

 indicates change in affiliation.

 indicates seat up for re-election after casual vacancy.

Election results

Elections of the 2010s 

Following the death of Councillor Jack Spriggs on 11 December 2009 a by election was held on 18 February 2010.

Elections of the 2000s 

After the boundary change of 2004 the whole of Liverpool City Council faced election. Three Councillors were returned.

• italics - Denotes the sitting Councillor.
• bold - Denotes the winning candidate.

External links
Ward Profile - Fazakerley

References

Wards of Liverpool